Olga James (born February 16, 1929) is an American singer and actress best known for her role in the film Carmen Jones (1954). Her later acting credits include a role in the Broadway musical Mr. Wonderful and a reoccurring role on The Bill Cosby Show. James was married to jazz musician Julian "Cannonball" Adderley from 1962 until his death in 1975.

Life and career 
James was born in Washington, D.C. on February 16, 1929. Her father was a saxophonist and her mother was a dancer on the Chitlin Circuit. Her parents separated during her childhood and her mother remarried. James was raised by her grandparents until she was admitted into Juilliard in New York City, then she went to live with her mother in Newark, New Jersey. ==
At Juilliard, James befriended singer Leontyne Price. Although James studied opera, she preferred to sing Mozart art songs, German lieder, and French chansons. Through networking at Juilliard, she was hired for her first professional role in 1952 as member of the production of Virgil Thomson's opera Four Saints in Three Acts which performed at a festival in Paris. Some time after she returned to New York, she earned a coveted spot as a singer in the all-black revue Larry Steele's Smart Affairs at Atlantic City's Club Harlem. While the revue was touring, she was recommended to audition for Otto Preminger's film Carmen Jones (1954), an all-black musical based on Georges Bizet's opera Carmen. James played the part of Cindy Lou, fiancée of Joe, played by Harry Belafonte. Following the success of the film, James appeared in nightclubs and she made her television debut during a Harlem Globetrotters game in 1955. James, who was referred to as the sepia Leslie Caron, was managed by Harlem Globetrotters owner Abe Saperstein.

In 1956, James made her Broadway debut opposite of Sammy Davis Jr. as Ethel Pearson in Mr. Wonderful. During the production she became friends with actress Frances Taylor who was dating jazz musician Miles Davis. One night, Taylor took James to see Davis perform at a nightclub where she introduced her to saxophonist Julian "Cannonball" Adderley. James saw Adderley four years later in Los Angeles before she embarked on an international tour in 1960. Two years later, she went with her friend to see Adderley perform in March 1962. They began dating and married on June 28 at New York City Hall. The couple had a surprise church wedding in Florida, arranged by Adderley's parents and spent their honeymoon at the Fontainebleau Hotel in Miami Beach. They remained together until his death in 1975.

Between 1969 and 1971, James had a reoccurring role on The Bill Cosby Show. In 1972, she did voice-over work for the cartoon series Sealab 2020. She is remarried to folk musician Len Chandler.

Vocal credits 

 1954: Carmen Jones (From the Original Soundtrack)
 1956: Sammy Davis Jr. / 1956 Broadway Cast – Mr. Wonderful
 1972: Cannonball Adderley Presents the Nat Adderley Sextet Plus Rick Holmes – Soul of the Bible
 1972: The Cannonball Adderley Quintet – The Happy People
 1974: David Axelrod – Heavy Axe

References

External links 

 
 Olga James on IBDB

1929 births
Actresses from Washington, D.C.
Singers from Washington, D.C.
American musical theatre actresses
20th-century African-American women singers
Juilliard School alumni
Living people
21st-century African-American people
21st-century African-American women